Koldun is the debut album from Belarusian singer Dmitry Koldun. Due to the change in producer and label, the album has been postponed many times and the name has changed from Ангел Под Дождем as it was Koldun's previous producer, Lunev, who named the album. Koldun released the album under his own label Lizard Studios 3 September 2009. On 21 August 2009 Koldun signed a deal with Russian leading media company Soyuz (Union) to produce and sell the album.

2008: Angel in the Rain
In an interview in August 2008 Koldun finally told the public the name of his previously untitled album. In the interview Koldun mentions that he wrote many songs for the album but perhaps only two will be featured.

On a Russian music news site, a representative correspondent from InterMedia (Russia) has stated that Koldun has worked on writing his own songs (music and lyrics) and is expected to produce about 20 songs in a more rock style to his current pop rock-themed music. The correspondent also stated that it is currently unknown what will happen to these new songs but are likely to remain just as a recording (in Moscow).

Koldun has shown great interest in releasing music in the UK and the US.

The album (under producer Lunev) was planned to feature both English and Russian songs with the possibility of having 12 tracks in total.

Production problems
The album was slated first to be released on 11 June 2008 (Koldun's birthday) but some minor production problems caused the release to be postponed to autumn 2008. However, in 2008 Koldun stopped working with Lunev due to conflicting opinions. Lunev did not want Koldun's own songs being featured on the debut album. Since the dispute Koldun is now his own producer and the album release was pushed to February/March 2009. Koldun has said (translated from Russian) "I was deciding for a long time what to do, but at the end of all I saw this is not going to work out and I decided to be my own producer. To be alone and be able to do with my music what I want."

After more than two years since Koldun was first made popular in Eurovision he announced on his official website that a ceremony will be held on 3 September to celebrate the release of his debut album. News later came of the title of the album Koldun a change to its previous title.

Track listing

See also
Dmitry Koldun
Dmitry Koldun discography
Lizard

References

External links
Official Website (Rus/Eng)
Official forum (Rus)
Unofficial forum (Eng)

2009 debut albums
Dmitry Koldun albums